The following is a list of Turkish wine regions. Anatolia played a pivotal role in the early history of wine and is likely to have been one of the earliest wine-producing regions of the world.

Turkey is geographically located on the wine belt thanks to its suitable climatic conditions and soil character. Annual grape harvest in Turkey accounts for 3.6 million tonnes putting it on the 6th place in the world. However, only 2% of that amount is suitable for wine production. Wine production was neglected in Turkey primarily on the grounds of religion. Major wine regions are Aegean, Marmara and Central Anatolia.

Marmara wine region 
The Thrace and Marmara wine region is situated south of Bulgaria and southeast of Greece, bordering the Black Sea, Marmara Sea and the Aegean Sea. The climate is characterized as typical Mediterranean climate showing maritime conditions with hot summers and mild winters. The soil of the region is composed mainly of limestone, gravelly loam and dense cracking clay. The grape varieties typical to this region are Adakarası, Cabernet Franc, Cabernet Sauvignon, Chardonnay, Cinsaut, Gamay, Kalecik Karası, Merlot, Papazkarası, Riesling, Sauvignon blanc, Semillion, Syrah and Viognier. The Marmara wine region contributes to all the wine produced in Turkey with 13.6%.

Aegean wine region 
The Aegean wine region consists of viticultural areas in the Aegean Region of Turkey, which are mainly in the provinces of Manisa, Izmir and Denizli. Winemaking areas like Eceabat and Bozcaada, districts of Çanakkale Province and geographically part of the Marmara Region, are considered within this wine region. The climate on the coastal areas is maritime, typical Mediterranean with hot summers and mild winters, while on the Anatolian plateau it is continental with few rainfall. The soil of the region consists partly of clay loam and is also calcareous (chalk and limestone). Alicante Bouschet, Boğazkere, Bornova Misketi, Cabernet Franc, Cabernet Sauvignon, Carignan, Chardonnay, Çalkarası, Çavuş, Dimrit, Grenache, Kalecik Karası, Karalahna, Karasakız (Kuntra), Malbec, Merlot, Mourvèdre, Narince, Öküzgözü, Petit Verdot, Pinot noir, Sangiovese, Sauvignon Blanc, Syrah, Sultaniye, Tempranillo, Vasilaki and Viognier are the grape varieties of the region. The Aegean wine region produces about 52.7% of the wine in Turkey.

Mediterranean wine region 

The southernmost wine region of Turkey is the Mediterranean including wine production mainly in Antalya Province and Mersin Province. The climate of the region is typical Mediterranean characterized with hot summers and mild winters. The soil found here varies from pebbly clay loam to calcareous chalks. The regions wine varieties are Boğazkere, Cabernet Sauvignon, Chardonnay, Kalecik Karas›, Malbec, Merlot, Öküzgözü, Pinot Noir, Sauvignon Blanc and Syrah. The region's contribution to the Turkey's wine production is only 0.2%.

Mid-southern Anatolia wine region 
The Mid-southern Anatolia wine region consists of the provinces Kayseri, Kırşehir, Aksarayi and Niğde in east of Central Anatolia. The climate has a  continental character with hot dry summers and cold winters. At the Cappadocia steppes, the daily temperature shows a big difference between day and night. The soil found in the region is sand, sandstone, decomposed volcanic tuff, the latter contributing to good quality grapes for wine production. Chardonnay, Dimrit, Emir, Kalecik Karası, Malbec, Narince, Öküzgözü, Sauvignon Blanc, Tempranillo are the grape varieties of the region. 12.1% of the country's wine production comes out of the region.

Mid-northern Anatolia wine region 

The Mid-northern Anatolia wine region includes the vineyards of Uşak Province in the west and Ankara Province in mid-north of Central Anatolia. The region's climate is continental with hot dry summers and cold winters. Main soil type is pebbly clay loam. Wine varieties of the region are Boğazkere, Kalecik Karası, Öküzgözü and Syrah. The wine production of the Mid-northern Anatolia region makes out 3.3% of Turkey's total production.

Mid-eastern Anatolia wine region 
The Mid-eastern Anatolia wine region includes the wine areas of Tokat Province in the north, Elazığ Province and Malatya Province in the east. The climate of Tokat area shows a transition between the Central Black Sea and the Central Anatolia climates while the climate of Elazığ and Malatya is typical terrestrial. In Tokat, the soil is glaciated alluvial fan and Yeşilırmak river bed. In the Elazığ and Malatya area, it ranges from red clay to decomposed granite and chalky clay. Typical grape varieties of the region are Narince, Boğazkere and Öküzgözü. The region produces 14.7% of all the country's wine.

Southeast Anatolia wine region 

Diyarbakır Province is the main wine growing area in Southeastern Anatolia. The climate is terrestrial characterized with dry, very hot days and cold nights in the summer time. The soil differs from decomposed sandstone to red clay. Boğazkere is the main grape variety of the region, which produces 3.4% of Turkey's wine.

See also
 Turkish wine

References

Wine regions
 
Turkish